Pavel Zakharov (born 9 March 1994) is a Russian football player who currently plays as a forward for Deren FC of the Mongolian Premier League.

Club career
Zakharov  came up through the youth teams of FC Chita. He was promoted to the first team in 2013. He went on to make his fully-professional debut for the club in the Russian Professional Football League East. He also appeared for the team in the Russian Cup. In total he made 88 league appearances, scoring five goals for the club. 

In January 2019 he joined Mongolian Premier League club Khangarid FC for the 2019 season. He finished the season second in the top scorer's list with 28 goals in 22 league matches as the team finished third in the table. Prior to Zakharov's contract expiring with Khangarid on 27 October 2019, he was offered a contract by league champions Ulaanbaatar City FC. He officially joined the club on a free Bosman transfer on 28 January 2020 ahead of the team's opening fixture of 2020 AFC Cup qualification.

In the winter 2021/2022 transfer window Zakharov signed for Deren FC.

References

External links
 Profile by Russian Football National League
 Soccerway profile

1994 births
Living people
Russian footballers
Association football forwards
FC Chita players
Ulaanbaatar City FC players
Deren FC players